Georges Matis (18.. – 18 November 1967) was a 20th-century French Singer-songwriter and pianist.

He is mostly remembered for the duet he  formed with Jean Loysel in the 1920s and 1930s as lyricist or composer.

Works 
(selection)
 L'Araignée au plafond, musical comedy (20 December 1928), libretto by Albert-Jean ; lyrics by Jean Loysel ; music by Jean Loysel and Georges Matis. Reedition 
 Le Tour d'horizon de René Dorin 
 Le Français mesuré 
 Le Bouc à Nanon 
 La Première Fois valse [for voice and piano] 
 Mimi, voici la fin du mois, valse tendre 
 L'Oubliée 
 Y en a des... java [for voice and piano] 
 Y a des parasites
 Tout est relatif [for voice and piano] 
 Théoriquement mélodie [for voice and piano]
 Ah ! Les fraises et les framboises by Serge Plaute, E. Wollf and Georges Matis (old song revived in 1926)

External links 
 Georges Matis on Encyclopédie Multimedia de la Comédie Musicale (ECMF)

French singer-songwriters
French composers
French lyricists
Date of birth unknown
1967 deaths